A remote data entry (RDE) system is a computerized system designed for the collection of data in electronic format.  The term is most commonly applied to a class of software used in the life sciences industry for collecting patient data from participants in clinical research studies—research of new drugs and/or medical devices.

Typically, RDE systems provide:
 a graphical user interface component for data entry
 a validation component to check user data
 a reporting tool for analysis of the collected data

RDE software was started in the mid- to late-1980s as software installed locally on portable computers with modems.  It has largely been replaced by a newer generation of software called electronic data capture, or EDC, that provides the same type of functionality over the Internet using web pages.

See also
 Clinical data acquisition
 Electronic data capture, provides a brief history of the RDE and EDC software landscape, remote jobs.

Clinical research
Pharmaceutical industry
Clinical data management